The Carpenter may refer to:

 The Carpenter (film), a 1988 horror film directed by David Wellington
 The Carpenter (album), an album by The Avett Brothers
 "The Carpenter" (Nightwish song), 1997
 "The Carpenter" (John Conlee song), 1986
 The Carpenter (film 2021), a 2021 thriller film directed by Steven Renso

See also
 The Carpenters, an American vocal and instrumental duo
 Carpenter (disambiguation)